Nazmi Mohamad is the current Minister of Culture, Youth and Sports since 2022.

Education 
He immediately started work with the Brunei government after graduating from Universiti Brunei Darussalam in 1991.

Political career
Nazmi became the Deputy Permanent Secretary, Ministry of Foreign Affairs and Trade (MOFAT) and Director of the Budget Division in the Ministry of Finance (MoF), in 2007 and 2008 respectively. But soon later reappointed to his previous position as MOFAT's Deputy Permanent Secretary. He holds several other positions in 2012; Alternate Governor of the Asian Development Bank (ADB), Chairman of the Islamic Financial Supervisory Board, Chairman of the Brunei Darussalam Deposit Protection Corporation, Joint Deputy Chairman of the Employees Trust Fund, Deputy Chairman of the Center for Strategic and Policy Studies (CSPS), and lastly the Permanent Secretary at the MoF's Management and International in the Temburong District.

In 2014, he became a Mmember of the Brunei Economic Development Board (BEDB) and represented Brunei Darussalam in the ASEAN Intergovernmental Commission on Human Rights (AICHR). Moreover, Nazmi was appointed as the Permanent Secretary (Corporate Affairs and Public Administration) for the MoF at the Prime Minister's Office.

On 7 June 2022, Nazmi was appointed as the new minister for the Ministry of Culture, Youth and Sports. It was only announced following a cabinet reshuffle, succeeding Aminuddin Ihsan who has ben holding that position since 2018. His appointment as the new minister was congratulated by Japan's Ambassador Maeda, and hoped for more collaborations to tighten the relations of Brunei and Japan. During a forum focusing on concept of Melayu Islam Beraja (MIB) on 4 October, Minister Nazmi voiced his concerns over the government's efforts on the country's order and security by taking the well-being of the citizens into account.

Honours 

  Order of Setia Negara Brunei First Class (PSNB) – Dato Seri Setia (15 July 2022)
  Long Service Medal (PLK) – (4 July 2016)

References

Living people
Government ministers of Brunei
Year of birth missing (living people)